Folkswort ("people's word") was a Yiddish-language daily newspaper published from Warsaw, Poland. Folkswort was an organ of the Labour Zionist Poalei Zion Right. Folkswort had its office at Nalewki Street.

References

Daily newspapers published in Poland
Defunct newspapers published in Poland
Newspapers published in Warsaw
Yiddish-language mass media in Poland
Yiddish socialist newspapers
Zionism in Poland
Labor Zionism
Jews and Judaism in Warsaw
Publications with year of establishment missing
Publications with year of disestablishment missing